Andrew Jordan (born 24 May 1989 in Sutton Coldfield) is a British auto racing driver, who has driven in the British Touring Car Championship. He was the 2013 British Touring Car Champion.

Racing career

Rallycross

Jordan first started racing in rallycross. In 2003, he entered the Ford Rally Academy, and went on to win the Winter Junior Rallycross Championship. The next year, he was the BTRDA Junior Rallycross Champion, and won the title of best newcomer in the British Junior series. In 2005, he won four different titles, the Junior Rallycross title, the BTRDA Rallycross title, as well as the Super Series Junior and the Ginetta Winterseries titles. In 2006, Jordan was the youngest ever driver and race winner in the British Rallycross Supercar class, in a Team Eurotech Ford Focus. The protégé of 1992 European Rallycross Champion Will Gollop made it to runner-up in the 2007 British Rallycross Championship, claiming three wins.

Jordan made a one-off return to rallycross in 2014 when he competed with a Ford Fiesta ST Supercar of Olsbergs MSE in the second round of the FIA World Rallycross Championship at Lydden Hill, finishing in third place. In 2015, he participated in two more World RX rounds; in Great Britain, he raced a Peugeot 208 Supercar for Team Peugeot-Hansen, and in Italy, an Audi S1 Supercar for EKS RX.

Renault Clio Cup

After driving some races in the 2006 SEAT Cupra Championship, he raced in the 2007 Renault Clio Cup, which supports the British Touring Car Championship. Driving for his father's team, he finished twelfth in the championship with a best result of second, coming in the opening round at Brands Hatch.

British Touring Car Championship

Eurotech Racing (2008)

In 2008, it was announced that he would join his father Mike Jordan (himself an experienced touring car and sportscar driver) as part of a two car Team Eurotech in the British Touring Car Championship. This was the first time a father and son would drive together in series history and both drove ex-Team Dynamics Honda Integras. The teenager's first season was a successful one, despite some reliability problems from his ageing but competitive Integra. This included two podiums, at Oulton Park and Knockhill. He finished the season in thirteenth place, one place ahead of his father.

VX Racing (2009)

For 2009, it was announced that he would continue in the BTCC in a Vauxhall Vectra for the works Vauxhall team alongside Fabrizio Giovanardi and Matt Neal. Jordan scored his first pole position at the third round of the season at Donington Park, becoming the youngest driver to do so in BTCC history. He held this record until Alex MacDowall took pole position at Snetterton the following season. Having achieved a best result of second on three occasions, he finished the season 10th in the drivers standings behind his teammates. Vauxhall withdrew from the BTCC as a works team at the end of the season.

Pirtek Racing (2010–2014)

In 2010, Jordan rejoined his family-run team now under the Pirtek Racing banner, running a Vectra with a turbo engine prepared by TOCA to the NGTC regulations which would power all the cars from 2011 onwards. He scored his first series win in the third race of round five at Croft, having started from pole due to the reverse grid system. At Snetterton, Jordan was hampered by an engine failure which prevented him from starting the final race of the weekend. He took a second win in the final race of the season at Brands Hatch, again a reversed grid race.

In 2011, Pirtek Racing expanded to two cars to run Jordan and Jeff Smith Jordan only scored points in one race at Brands Hatch but he followed this with a string of five consecutive podiums, including a race win at Donington Park. Results were average for the rest of the season apart from two further podiums. He finished 6th in the Drivers Championship and 3rd in the Independents' Trophy.

In 2012, Pirtek Racing ran two Team Dynamics prepared NGTC Honda Civics. Jordan took pole position for the third round of the championship at Thruxton but retired at the start of the first race having spun out at the first corner in the wet conditions.

Jordan stayed with the team in 2013. He took pole position for the opening round of the season at Brands Hatch after deteriorating track conditions due to a snow shower prevented drivers from improving their times. He finished second in the first race behind Jason Plato having collided with the MG driver at the final corner while attempting to take the lead of the race. Jordan won the 2013 BTCC at the final round at Brands Hatch GP circuit on 13 October 2013.

In what turned out to be his final season for Pirtek Racing, Jordan won 4 races, including the first 2 races of the season at Brands Hatch, getting 2 pole positions and 4 fastest race laps on the way. He also set the fastest ever BTCC lap around Thruxton in qualifying, finishing the lap in 1 minute 16.192 seconds, averaging 111.31 mph. He finished 5th in the championship with 310 points, only 6 less than 4th-placed Mat Jackson. His championship challenge was effectively ended after a desperately poor weekend at Snetterton, finishing 16th and 15th, and not even starting the 3rd race of the weekend. His poor run briefly continued at Knockhill, where he retired from the first race, but recovered to finish 11th and 5th in the other 2 races of the weekend. He also finished 3rd in the competition for the Independent's Trophy, only 88 points behind the winner Colin Turkington, and 10th in the Jack Sears Trophy, 40 points off eventual winner Dave Newsham.

In 2014, he also briefly entered into the FIA World Rallycross Championship, competing in the British round of the series.

Triple Eight Racing (2015)
Jordan left Eurotech after the 2014 season to join the works MG team, run by Triple Eight Racing, maintaining his Pirtek sponsorship. He had previously driven for the team in 2009 when they ran the Vauxhall BTCC factory programme. It was to be a lean year however with only 5 podiums to his name. This meant he finished 5th in the standings.

Motorbase Performance (2016)
In October 2015, Jordan announced he would be moving to Motorbase for the 2016 season driving their Ford Focus ST, again taking his Pirtek sponsorship with him. He took his first win in 16 months at Thruxton and won again at Silverstone. He ranked 8th at the end of the year also winning the independents championship for a third time.

West Surrey Racing (2017–2019)

In November 2016, Jordan joined the works BMW team, run by West Surrey Racing, on a two-year deal driving the 125i M Sport, once more taking his Pirtek sponsorship.

Other activities
In 2011, Jordan contested a one-off race meeting for Team-LNT in the opening round of the British GT Championship season at Oulton Park, driving a Ginetta G55 GT3. He finished 15th in class in the first race and retired from the second race.

Jordan was also entered for the Shannons Supercar Showdown television program in Australia, created by V8 Supercars team Kelly Racing with the aim to get one of ten drivers onto the grid of the 2011 Bathurst 1000 alongside Grant Denyer. Jordan finished runner-up to local Formula Ford driver Cameron Waters.

At the final round of the 2017 Pickup Truck Racing Championship, Jordan made a one-off appearance. An impressive performance saw Andrew take the victory in the second race of the day.

Racing record

Complete British Touring Car Championship results
(key) (Races in bold indicate pole position – 1 point awarded in first race) (Races in italics indicate fastest lap – 1 point awarded all races) (* signifies that driver lead race for at least one lap – 1 point given all races)

‡ Hybrid Test Entry – not eligible for points

Complete British GT Championship results
(key) (Races in bold indicate pole position in class) (Races in italics indicate fastest lap in class)

Complete FIA European Rallycross Championship results

Supercar

Complete FIA World Rallycross Championship results

Supercar

References

External links

  Pirtek
  Eurotechracing
 
Profile at BTCCPages.com

1989 births
Living people
Sportspeople from Sutton Coldfield
English racing drivers
British Touring Car Championship drivers
British Touring Car Championship Champions
British GT Championship drivers
World Rallycross Championship drivers
Renault UK Clio Cup drivers
Peugeot Sport drivers
BMW M drivers